Evanslea is a rural locality in the Toowoomba Region, Queensland, Australia. In the  Evanslea had a population of 41 people.

Norillee is a neighbourhood.

Geography 
Evanslea has the following mountains:

 Mount Russell 
 Mount Taylor 

Evanslea railway station is an abandoned railway station on the closed Cecil Plains railway line .

The land use is predominantly crop growing with some grazing on native vegetation, mostly in the south-east of the locality.

Road infrastructure
The Toowoomba–Cecil Plains Road runs through from east to west.

History 
The locality takes its name from the Evanslea railway station, which was named after Charles Barnard Evans, Commissioner for Railways in Queensland from 1911 to 1918. The railway station on the Cecil Plains railway line opened in September 1915 with Evanslea as its terminus. It was subsequently extended to Cecil Plains.

The neighbourhood of Norillee takes its name from the Norillee railway station (in neighbouring Bongeen), which was named by the Queensland Railways Department on12 December 1918. It is an Aboriginal name meaning mountain ridge or series of peaks.

In the  Evanslea had a population of 41 people.

Economy
There are a number of homesteads in the locality:

 Mount Russell
 Poplar
 Prairie View
 Rockwood
 Shiralee
 Valhalla

References

Toowoomba Region
Localities in Queensland